Khochireh (also Romanized as Khochīreh and Khūchīreh) is a village in Bala Taleqan Rural District, in the Central District of Taleqan County, Alborz Province, Iran. At the 2006 census, its population was 317, in 89 families.
 

" Khochire Efadeh_ie Dar Taleghan" (written by: Reza Yadegari) is name of a book which introduces this village. It is about cultural and traditional features of khochireh.

References 

Populated places in Taleqan County